The Romance of Chastisement is a Victorian pornographic collection on the theme of flagellation by St George Stock (a probable pseudonym, also credited with The Whippingham Papers) and published by John Camden Hotten in 1866.  It was reprinted by William Lazenby in 1883 and again by Charles Carrington in 1902 as The Magnetism of the Rod or the Revelations of Miss Darcy.

References

 Henry Spencer Ashbee (as Pisanus Fraxi), "Bibliography of Forbidden Books", Volume 1, 1877, p.353
 John Sutherland, "The Stanford Companion to Victorian Fiction", Stanford University Press, 1990, p.307.
 Walter M. Kendrick, "The secret museum: pornography in modern culture", University of California Press, 1996, p.168
 Sharon Marcus, "Between women: friendship, desire, and marriage in Victorian England", Princeton paperbacks, Princeton University Press, 2007, p.145
 Joanne Shattock, "The Cambridge Bibliography of English Literature:, Volume 4; Volumes 1800-1900", Cambridge University Press, 2000, p.1905
 Lisa Z. Sigel, International Exposure: Perspectives on Modern European Pornography, 1800-2000 (Rutgers University Press, 2005), pp.73-74,95-96

British pornography
1866 short story collections
BDSM literature
Books about flagellation